The Yavapai-Prescott Indian Tribe (Yavapai language: Wiikvteepaya), formerly known as the Yavapai-Prescott Tribe of the Yavapai Reservation, a federally recognized tribe of Yavapai people. Fewer than 200 people are enrolled in the tribe.

Reservation 
In the early 1930s, Sam Jimulla and his wife Viola Jimulla, with community support, pushed the government to provide reservation lands for the tribe, as they had been unable to secure federal funds for a housing project. In 1935, 75 acres of the former Fort Whipple, Arizona were set aside as a reservation. Continued pressure from the tribe resulted in an additional 1320 acres being conferred on the tribe in 1956.

Government 
Simultaneously with the creation of a reservation, the government pressed for the Prescott Yavapai to accept the terms of the Indian Reorganization Act, but the tribe rejected the move away from a hereditary chief and confirmed the commissioner of Indian Affairs choice of Jimulla as their tribal leader. When Jimulla died in 1940, he was succeeded by his wife, though a tribal council was established. Don Mitchell, husband of Jimulla's daughter Grace, served as Chair of the tribal council from 1940 to 1948 and then tribal president from 1948 to 1972, though Viola served as Chieftess until her death. Grace Mitchell succeeded her parents as chieftess in 1967 and in 1972, Jimulla's granddaughter Patricia Ann McGee became tribal president. Upon Mitchell's death in 1976, the tribe conferred the title of chieftess upon Jimulla's other surviving daughter, Lucy Miller, and reconfirmed the dual governance system by retaining McGee as tribal president.

Following Miller's 1984 death the tribal leadership was solely vested in the council and the tribal president. McGee retained the post until 1988, when she was ousted for two years by Stanhope "Stan" Rice, Jr. She regained leadership in 1990 and served until her death. Rice regained the presidency in 1994 and held the position until his ouster in 2001. He was succeeded by Ernest Jones, Sr. The tribe is headquartered in Prescott, Arizona.

Economic development 
The tribe has a shopping center, two casinos, and a hotel where the reservation abuts State Highway 69 at Prescott, Arizona.  A business park is on the reservation off State Highway 89 north of Prescott. The 2000 census reported a resident population of 182 persons on the Yavapai-Prescott Indian Reservation, 117 of whom were of solely Native American heritage.

Services 
Law enforcement services are provided by the Yavapai-Prescott Tribal Police Department.

Charlie Ben Wilson

Notable tribal members 
 Viola Jimulla (1878–1966), chief of the Prescott Yavapai from 1940 to 1966.

Education
The reservation is served by the Prescott Unified School District.

See also 
 Yavapai people

Citations

References 
 Yavapai-Prescott Reservation, Arizona United States Census Bureau

External links 
 Yavapai-Prescott Indian Tribe, official website

Native American tribes in Arizona
Prescott, Arizona
Federally recognized tribes in the United States
Geography of Yavapai County, Arizona
American Indian reservations in Arizona
Yavapai